Erik Ian Asphaug (born October 19, 1961 in Oslo, Norway) is a Norwegian American planetary science professor in the School of Earth and Space Exploration at University of Arizona. Asphaug received his bachelor's degree in mathematics and English from Rice University and his PhD in planetary science from the University of Arizona.

Until 2012, Asphaug served as a professor at the University of California at Santa Cruz.

The 1998 recipient of the Harold C. Urey Prize from the American Astronomical Society, Asphaug is at the forefront of scientists studying the "rubble pile" composition of most asteroids and the implications of such composition on efforts to divert asteroids from striking the Earth. Asphaug has also worked with Urey Prize winner Robin M. Canup to develop new theories on how the Moon was formed.  Recently he has studied the genesis of diverse small planets and asteroids in the aftermath of collisions between similar-sized planetoids during the middle to late stages of terrestrial planet formation.

Asphaug was involved in NASA's Galileo and LCROSS missions. He is currently a principal advocate of a mission strategy to obtain a medical-like scan of the detailed interior structure of a Jupiter-family comet, which would reveal its origin, evolution and structure using techniques of 3D radar imaging and tomography.

Asteroid 7939 Asphaug was named in his honor.

Asphaug is an Eagle Scout.

Publications
 When the Earth Had Two Moons: Cannibal Planets, Icy Giants, Dirty Comets, Dreadful Orbits, and the Origins of the Night Sky (2019)

References

External links
 Asphaug's web page at UCSC
 Asphaug's web page at ASU 
 Asphaug's cumulative bio-bibliography
 http://adsabs.harvard.edu

1961 births
Living people
Scientists from Oslo
Norwegian emigrants to the United States
American astronomers
Planetary scientists
Rice University alumni
University of Arizona alumni
University of California, Santa Cruz faculty
University of Arizona faculty